Cherie Roberts (born December 8, 1978, in Oakland, California), aka Kitana Jade, is a model and photographer who worked with Playboy in the early to mid-2000s, modeled for numerous magazines and websites, and toured with  Hot Import Nights car shows from 2000 to 2006.

Roberts was born to a father of Irish, British, and German descent and a mother of Vietnamese, French and Chinese descent. She was raised in San Jose, California, with her younger sister and older brother. She was an exotic dancer in San Francisco when she was discovered by a local company to model for a bikini calendar. In 2000, Roberts modeled for several Playboy Special Edition issues, and created her own website which she designed and maintained on her own. In 2001, Roberts moved to Hollywood after she was crowned Miss Hot Import Nights 2001. She toured with the company for several years, making dozens of appearances across the US. Roberts was featured in several import car scene DVDs and in the racing video game, Street Racing Syndicate. She was also one of the early adopters of social networking site, MySpace, where her page quickly became one of the most trafficked pages on the site, establishing Roberts as an early MySpace celebrity.

In 2005, Roberts created a second website for her photography, and began actively shooting photography for Suicide Girls. Since then, she is best known for shooting glamour and nude photography for several companies, including gaming sites UGO.com and IGN.com and alternative culture community site, EvilHearts.com. In 2007, she shot a calendar featuring nude models and vintage video game consoles for a company called Nerdcore. She followed up the 2007 Nerdcore calendar with the 2008 Nerdcore calendar featuring nude models shot as superheroes and villains which Maxim magazine dubbed "The Sexiest Calendar in 2008" in their February 2008 US issue. In 2009 and 2010, Roberts continued her work with Nerdcore by putting out a sci-fi themed calendar in 2009 and a horror-themed calendar in 2010. In 2011, Roberts teamed up with Penthouse (magazine) and THQ to create downloadable content for their video game, Saints Row: The Third. Roberts shot several of Penthouse's most popular models, and THQ used the images to create bonus characters and stories to be used for the downloadable "Penthouse Pack" content. Roberts' work is also regularly published in BPM magazine, in a monthly feature. In addition to her glamour and nude photography, Roberts has also shot various celebrities and bands.

Roberts continues to pursue her photography career, write articles, and still maintains her websites.

Bands and celebrities photographed by Roberts

Danny McBride (actor)
My Chemical Romance
Deftones
AFI (band) members Davey Havok, Jade Puget and Hunter Burgan
Good Charlotte
Puscifer (solo project of Maynard James Keenan of Tool and A Perfect Circle fame)
Mark Hoppus of Blink 182 and Pete Wentz of Fall Out Boy
Jimmy Eat World
Taryn Manning (actor)
Justin Theroux (actor)
The All-American Rejects
The Boondock Saints II: All Saints Day cast members (Sean Patrick Flanery, Norman Reedus, Clifton Collins, Jr., Julie Benz, and writer/director Troy Duffy)
Serj Tankian of System of a Down
Kristina and Karissa Shannon of Playboy's The Girls Next Door
Puddle of Mudd members Wes Scantlin and Ryan Yerdon
Buckcherry members Josh Todd and Keith Nelson
The Smashing Pumpkins and Hole bassist Melissa Auf der Maur
Against Me! lead singer Tom Gabel
Shwayze and Cisco Adler of MTV's Buzzin' (TV series)
Wolfmother lead singer Andrew Stockdale
Foxy Shazam
Caroline D' Amore (actor)
IGN host Jessica Chobot
Jordan Zevon (musician)

Modeling appearances in magazines
Showgirls Magazine, November 2000 cover and feature
Showgirls Magazine, January 2001 centerfold pull-out
Super Street, March 2001 cover and feature
Playboy's College Girls Spring 2001 feature
Import Tuner, May 2001 cover and feature
Lowrider Euro, June/July 2001 cover and feature
Playboy's Sexy College Girls September 2001 feature
Penthouse, Australia, 2001 feature
Hustler, catalog volume 2.1 featured model
Auto, Sound and Security, August 2002 cover and feature
Card Player, volume 15, #February 4, 2002 cover with Larry Flynt
Looker, May 2003 feature
Leg Sex, June 2003 cover and feature
Playboy, July 2003 2 Fast 2 Furious 2 Fine feature
Leg Show, October 2003 feature
Lowrider Euro, October/November 2003 cover and feature

Video and DVD appearances
360 Video Hard Drive DVD Star Feature
360 Video Best of 360 Video DVD Feature
360 Video Deleted Scenes DVD Star Feature
Blue Slate Entertainment Import Covergirls Volume 1 DVD Star Feature
Hip-Hop Honeys Blazin' Asians DVD Feature
Hot Body Video Magazine Bare Brunettes DVD Feature
Peach DVD Here Comes The Judge DVD Feature
Peach DVD Road Strip DVD Feature
Peach DVD Invitation Only DVD Feature
Mystique's Hottest Buns and Best Legs DVD Feature
Mystique presents H2ohh DVD Feature
Mystique DVD Stripped and Outrageous Web Chicks DVD Feature
Mystique's Asian Beauties Exposed DVD Feature
JMH Productions Just Eighteen DVD Star Feature
JMH Productions Hawaiian Fantasies DVD Feature
EEB Productions Exotic Erotic Ball DVD Feature

References

External links
Official Cherie Roberts Website
Cherie Roberts iheartgirls photography blog
Cherie Roberts' photography portfolio site
IGN.com's Babeology feature
Cherie Roberts official Facebook page
Cherie Roberts' MySpace photography page
Cherie Roberts' DeviantArt photography portfolio
Cherie Roberts' Suicide Girls Photography
Nerdcore official website
UGO.com's Foxy Fans feature
EvilHearts.com gallery page

American female adult models
1978 births
American bloggers
Living people
Artists from Oakland, California
Artists from San Jose, California
American people of Irish descent
American people of British descent
American people of German descent
American artists of Vietnamese descent
American people of Vietnamese descent
American people of French descent
American people of Chinese descent
Writers from Oakland, California
American women bloggers
21st-century American women